Metacrinia is a genus of frog in the family Myobatrachidae. It is monotypic, being represented by the single species, Metacrinia nichollsi, commonly known as the Forest toadlet or Nicholls toadlet. It is endemic to Southwest Australia, occurring between Dunsborough and Albany.

Description
Metacrinia nichollsi is a squat frog with short limbs and reaches  in length. The dorsal colouration is very dark brown or black occasionally with pink flecks. The ventral surface is grey, dark blue or black with white marbling. There are yellow or orange markings at the base of each arm and on the underside of the thighs and lower belly. The skin on the dorsum is warty and the belly is granular. The tympanum is visible and the fingers and toes are free of webbing.

It is the only described species in the genus Metacrinia. The toadlet is poorly studied, but the diverse appearance of the toadlet suggests there may be more than one species.

Ecology and behaviour
This species is found amongst leaf litter, under stones and logs in karri and jarrah forests. Breeding occurs in late summer with most activity after rain. The males make a short "ark" similar to that of species in the genus Pseudophryne. 25–30 eggs are laid in damp ground cover where they develop directly without a larval stage. The species was assessed as Least Concern in 2004.

Similar species
Metacrinia may be confused with Günther's toadlet, Pseudophryne guentheri. It can be distinguished by the orange ventral markings.

References

Further reading
Barker, J.; Grigg, G. C.; Tyler, M. J. (1995). A Field Guide to Australian Frogs. Surrey Beatty & Sons.

Myobatrachidae
Amphibians of Western Australia
Monotypic amphibian genera
Taxa named by Hampton Wildman Parker
Frogs of Australia
Endemic fauna of Southwest Australia